Robert Herbert (Bob) Griffiths (born 1953) is a Church in Wales priest: he has been Archdeacon of Wrexham since 2014.

He was born in Rhyl. He studied for ordination at Chichester Theological College. After  a curacy in Holywell he was a Chaplain to the Forces from 1979 until 1987. After this he served at Llanfair Dyffryn Clwyd, St Asaph and Llanrhos.

References

1953 births
People from Rhyl
Living people
Archdeacons of Wrexham
Alumni of Chichester Theological College
20th-century Welsh Anglican priests
21st-century Welsh Anglican priests